The 1894 Georgia Bulldogs football team represented the Georgia Bulldogs of the University of Georgia in the 1894 college football season and completed the year with a 5–1–record.  In 1894, the Bulldogs played their first game against South Carolina, won 40–0, and started a rivalry that continues to the present day.  Georgia also secured its first victory over Auburn. This was the team's one and only season under the guidance of head coach Robert Winston.  Winston was the first paid coach for the Bulldogs.

Schedule

References

Additional sources
 
 

Georgia
Georgia Bulldogs football seasons
Georgia Bulldogs football